The Mission laïque française (MLF), or "French lay (or secular) mission", is a non-profit organisation founded in 1902 by Pierre Deschamps. This organisation works to spread the French language and culture by creating and running schools outside France. Its head office is in the 15th arrondissement of Paris.

School network
By the end of 2016, the MLF was running schools in 47 different countries:   Afghanistan, Algeria, Angola, Armenia, Azerbaijan, Bahrain, Bosnia-Herzegovina, Brazil, Bulgaria, Cameroon, Canada, China, Côte d’Ivoire, DR of the Congo, Egypt, Equatorial Guinea, Ethiopia, Finland, Gabon, Greece, Haiti, India, Indonesia, Iran, Iraqi Kurdistan, Italy, Kazakhstan, Lebanon, Libya, Morocco, Nigeria, Norway, Palestine, Romania, Russia, Saudi Arabia, Senegal, South Korea, Spain, Syria, Turkmenistan, UAE, the United Kingdom, the United States, Uzbekistan, Venezuela, and Yemen.

The 108 schools are divided into two networks: traditional schools and schools in joint ventures with big French companies such as Total S.A., Areva, Airbus and Bouygues.

References

External links

French Courses Online

Mission laïque française
Associations of schools
 
French-language education
Language education organizations